Merrill Davis Osmond (born April 30, 1953) is an American musician, singer, and occasional actor. He is best known for being the lead vocalist and bassist of the family music group The Osmonds and The Osmond Brothers, as well as an occasional solo artist.

Early life
Osmond was born in Ogden, Utah, the fifth of the nine children of Olive May (née Davis; 1925–2004) and George Virl Osmond (1917–2007).

Career

Four of the Osmonds were cast over a seven-year period on NBC's The Andy Williams Show, a musical variety program. They also appeared in nine episodes of the 1963–64 ABC western television series The Travels of Jaimie McPheeters, with Merrill in the role of young Deuteronomy Kissel. The series starred then 12-year-old Kurt Russell on a wagon train headed to the American West.

A tenor/countertenor vocalist well into adulthood, Merrill was either lead singer or co-lead singer (usually sharing duties with younger brother Donny) on almost all of the Osmonds' songs and co-wrote, along with older brother Alan, many of them. When Donny began to focus on his own career in the late 1970s, Merrill grew out his beard and, along with his brothers, shifted to country music, recording a number of hits on the country charts in the 1980s; he also had one hit independent of his fellow Osmonds, a duet with session singer Jessica Boucher (younger sister of Savannah and Sherry Boucher), "You're Here to Remember (I'm Here to Forget)," which peaked at number 62 on the Hot Country Singles chart in May 1987. Osmond announced his intent to retire from performing in 2022 and performed his last American show in April of that year, with a UK tour to follow.

Merrill's final show took place at the barn, Ringwood on January 19th 2023. Later in 2023 he and his wife will be serving as missionaries for their church at the Washington DC temple

Merrill has been twice knighted, once by the Order of Saint Michael of the Wing and once by the Sovereign Military Order of the Temple of Jerusalem. In May 2017, he received an honorary doctorate in humanities from Dixie State University, now known as Utah Tech University.

Osmond has sporadically hosted the podcast Sound Advice with his son Justin since 2020, produced by KSL radio.

Personal life
Merrill was the first of the performing Osmond siblings to marry. He wed Mary Carlson on September 17, 1973; they have four sons, two daughters, and 15 grandchildren. Merrill's second son, Justin, is deaf, as are Justin's uncles, Virl and Tom Osmond, Merrill's two oldest brothers. Justin Osmond works with several organizations and launched the Olive Osmond Perpetual Hearing Fund in 2010. Merrill's youngest son, Troy, died in his sleep at age 33 on November 9, 2018 from an undiagnosed heart condition.

Like the rest of his family, Merrill is a member of the Church of Jesus Christ of Latter-day Saints. A statement of faith on his Web site expresses support for the Book of Mormon and the prophecies of Joseph Smith, as well as the church's compatibility with mainstream Christianity. In keeping with church tradition, all his sons have served as missionaries.

In a 2021 interview with GB News, Osmond described himself as "very conservative" person. He expressed mixed feelings toward former President Donald Trump, noting that his experience with Trump was that Trump was a "nice guy" but that Osmond was never comfortable with the way Trump spoke.Merrill Osmond: Trump ‘is a really nice guy’ but was ‘never really a fan of how he spoke’. GB News via YouTube. July 26, 2021. Retrieved July 1, 2022.

Discography

Studio albums 

 Osmonds (1970)
 Homemade (1971)
 Phase III (1972)
 Crazy Horses (1972)
 The Plan (1973)
 Love Me for a Reason (1974)
 The Proud One (1975)
 Brainstorm (1976)
 Osmond Christmas Album (1976)
 Steppin' Out (1979)

References

External links

Official website

 

1953 births
American Latter Day Saints
American male pop singers
American pop rock singers
American tenors
American rock bass guitarists
American country bass guitarists
American male bass guitarists
Songwriters from Utah
American country singers
Musicians from Ogden, Utah
Living people
The Osmonds members
People from Branson, Missouri
Osmond family (show business)
Guitarists from Utah
20th-century American bass guitarists
Country musicians from Missouri
20th-century American male musicians